Emergen-C is an effervescent, powdered drink mix vitamin supplement manufactured by Alacer Corp.  The Emergen-C product line was introduced in 1978. Alacer was established as a private company in 1972, focusing on vitamin supplements containing vitamin C. The company was acquired by Pfizer in 2012. In 2019, Pfizer consumer healthcare entered a joint venture with GSK. The brand is owned by Haleon since 18 July 2022.

It contains, depending on the variety, 16 times the vitamin C, 4 times the vitamin B12, and 5 times the vitamin B6 of the USDA Reference Daily Intake based on a 2000 calorie diet. Some versions include calcium, glucosamine, quercetin or lycopene.

Manufacturing
Pharmaceutical firm GlaxoSmithKline (GSK) is moving forward on plans to close its manufacturing plant in Carlisle, PA by mid-2021, several regional news organizations reported this week. Production of Emergen-C powdered Vitamin C supplement drink mix products at the site will be shifted to a facility in Puerto Rico.

Ingredients
GMO ingredients are used. From the Alacer website: "We have chosen to source materials that are non-GMO whenever possible. That being said, we cannot guarantee that all of our raw materials are sourced from non-GMO ingredients and do not currently have this requirement in place for our vendors".  Most products do not contain animal-derived ingredients, but some certain products contain chondroitin from cows, honey, and vitamin D3 from wool.

Emergen-C Class Action Lawsuit 
In December 2013, a superior court judge preliminarily approved a $6.45 million settlement to a class-action lawsuit filed against Alacer Corp.  for allegedly deceptively marketing the supplement Emergen-C. The complaint, which was originally filed earlier in the year, alleges that the company misleadingly represents that the supplement will provide health benefits – including reducing the risk of or preventing colds and flu – without scientific evidence to support such claims.  According to the settlement terms, class members may receive a refund of up to $36 with proof of purchase. (Wong et al v. Alacer Corp., Case No. CGC-12-519221, Superior Court of California County of San Francisco).  A superior court judge gave final approval of the settlement to this lawsuit in June 2014.

Outreach
In 1997, Alacer established The Emergen-C Fund, which has raised more than $650,000.
This fund provides support to Vitamin Angels, Surfrider Foundation, Keep A Breast Foundation, Young Survival Coalition, and Whole Foods' Whole Planet Foundation.

Alacer sponsors Operation Gratitude, a volunteer organization that has sent care packages to U.S. troops in Iraq and Afghanistan.

In 2008 Emergen-C teamed up with surf artist Jay Alders to create art for the packaging of their new product/flavor, Emergen-C Blue, with 25 cents donated to Surfrider Foundation for each box sold.

See also
Berocca
Vitamin C megadosage

References

External links
 Emergen-C Official Website (US)
 Emergen-C Official Website (Canada)
 Emergen-C Official Website (UK)

Dietary supplements
American brands
Haleon